Lingyuanosaurus (meaning "Lingyuan's lizard") is a genus of therizinosaurian dinosaur from the Early Cretaceous of China. It contains a single species, L. sihedangensis. It was found within a layer of the Jehol Group.

Discovery
The first fossil remains of Lingyuanosaurus were recovered in seven slabs of different sizes from lacustrine sediments of the Jehol Group at Sihedang, Liaoning Province of China. It is not known for certain whether the sediments in which Lingyuanosaurus was found correspond to the Jiufotang or Yixian formations. Given the fact that no other fossils were found in proximity, there were no duplicated elements, all bones had the same color and preservation, the fossils are regarded as belonging to a single individual. The specimen was formally described by Xi Yao and colleagues in 2019 and made the holotype for the new genus and species Lingyuanosaurus sihedangensis. The generic name, Lingyuanosaurus, is in reference to county-level city of Lingyuan and the specific name, sihedangensis, is in reference to its place of discovery as well, the town of Sihedang.

See also
 Timeline of therizinosaur research

References

External links

 
 

Therizinosaurs
Fossil taxa described in 2019